Imanta (M-04) is the lead ship of the  of minehunters for the Latvian Naval Forces. The vessel was formerly HNLMS Harlingen (M854), a Tripartite-class minehunter of the Royal Netherlands Navy built in 1984. Alkmaar and Imanta are, respectively, the Dutch and Latvian navies' names of the Tripartite class of minehunters, developed jointly by France, Belgium, and the Netherlands.

Harlingen was one of five minehunters sold to Latvia by the Netherlands in 2005 for approximately €11.4 million each. An investigation into possible corruption related to the vessels' acquisition was revealed in August 2009, when it was announced that the vessels were purchased without any instruction manuals or technical documents. It took Latvian officials over a year to acquire the necessary technical materials from France, at the cost of an additional €580,000.

Since 2009 Imanta has been active service with the Latvian Naval Forces and available for NATO operations.

References 

Alkmaar-class minehunters
Ships built in Belgium
Ships built in France
Ships built in the Netherlands
1984 ships
Imanta-class minehunters
Minehunters of Latvia